Mesosindris is a monotypic snout moth genus described by Pierre Viette in 1960. Its only species, Mesosindris paulianalis, described by the same author in the same year, is known from Madagascar.

References

Moths described in 1960
Pyralinae
Monotypic moth genera
Moths of Madagascar
Pyralidae genera